Layke Anderson (born 10 October 1983) is a British film director and former actor.

Career
Anderson starred opposite Udo Kier and Stephen Fry in the 2009 Luxembourgian-German drama House of Boys, though left acting behind shortly after to explore working behind the scenes.
Other acting credits include Richard Attenborough’s Closing the Ring, action-horror Re-Kill, and Babylon (TV series) directed by Danny Boyle.

Anderson's directorial debut Dylan's Room, starring Joanna Scanlan, screened at over thirty international film festivals winning multiple awards, and was later nominated for a British Independent Film Award.
Dylan's Room was followed by the experimental film,  Happy Thoughts.

Filmography
Director / Writer / Editor
2012: Dylan's Room (short)
2014: Happy Thoughts (short)
2016: Shopping (short)
2017: Epilogue (short)
2018: London Unplugged, Directed Shopping segment 
2019: Mankind (short)

Actor
2003: X2 as Cypher (Douglas Aaron Ramsey)  (uncredited)
2004: Almost Strangers as Heath
2006: Communism and Football as Eduard Streltsov
2007: Dolphins as Lawrence
2007: Popcorn as Cool Guy
2007: Closing the Ring as Army Corporal
2008: The Chef's Letter as The Young Man
2009: House of Boys as Frank
2012: The Equestrian as Freddie Forester
2013: Babylon (TV series)
2015: Re-Kill as Tom Falkirk

Awards
For Dylan's Room:
"Best Short Film" Cambridge Film Festival 2012
"Best Short Drama" Isle of Wight Film Festival 2012
"Best Drama" Aesthetica Short Film Festival 2012
"Media Award" Tirana International Film Festival 2012
 "Special Mention" Leeds International Film Festival 2012
 "Highly Commended" Scottish Mental Health Arts and Film Festival 2012
 "Best Drama" The Van d'Or Independent Film Awards 2013
The film was also long-listed for Best UK Short by BAFTA in 2012.

For Happy Thoughts:

"Online Award" Tirana International Film Festival 2014
"Palmares Social Action - Experimental & Ficción" International Euro Film Festival 2014
"Best Editing" Grand OFF World Independent Film Awards 2015

For Shopping:

"Best Short Film" Ramsgate International Film & TV Festival (UK) 2017
"Best Short Film" East Coast Film Festival (UK) 2016
"Special Mention" Anon Film Festival (UK) 2016

References

External links
LittleCricketFilms.com

1983 births
Living people